Events from the year 1463 in France

Incumbents
 Monarch – Louis XI

Births

Full date missing
Antoine Duprat, cardinal and politician (died 1535)

Deaths

Full date missing
Jean Bureau, artillery commander (born c.1390)
William Vorilong, philosopher and theologian (born c.1390)
François Villon, poet and criminal (born 1431; disappeared from view in 1463)
Marie of Anjou, queen consort (born 1404)

See also

References

1460s in France